Jose Luis Gamonal Ruiz (born 9 October 1989) is a Chilean footballer who plays as a goalkeeper for Maltese side Marsaxlokk.

Career
In January 2023, he moved abroad and joined Marsaxlokk in the Maltese Premier League.

References

1998 births
Living people
People from Temuco
Chilean footballers
Chilean expatriate footballers
Chilean Primera División players
Primera B de Chile players
Unión Temuco footballers
Deportes Temuco footballers
Cobresal footballers
C.D. Arturo Fernández Vial footballers
Maltese Premier League players
Marsaxlokk F.C. players
Chilean expatriate sportspeople in Malta
Expatriate footballers in Malta
Association football goalkeepers